Bon Homme Colony is a census-designated place (CDP) in Bon Homme County, South Dakota, United States, comprising the Bon Homme Hutterite Colony. The population was 97 at the 2020 census. It was first listed as a CDP prior to the 2020 census.

It is in the southeast corner of the county, on the north shore of Lewis and Clark Lake, a reservoir on the Missouri River.

Demographics

References 

Census-designated places in Bon Homme County, South Dakota
Census-designated places in South Dakota
Hutterite communities in the United States